Lilbi may refer to:
Lilbi, Hiiu County, village in Estonia
Lilbi, Saare County, village in Estonia